Gonzalagunia is a genus of plant in the family Rubiaceae. Species include:
 Gonzalagunia bifida B.Ståhl
 Gonzalagunia dodsonii Dwyer
 Gonzalagunia mollis Spruce ex K.Schum.
 Gonzalagunia pauciflora B.Ståhl

References 

 
Rubiaceae genera
Taxonomy articles created by Polbot